Giuseppe Casari (10 April 1922 − 12 November 2013) was an Italian footballer who played as a goalkeeper.

Career
Born and raised in Martinengo, Bergamo, Casari debuted for his local club Atalanta in the 1944 regional championship and in Serie A the following year. In 1948 he was the starting goalkeeper for the national team at the London Olympics but, following a clean sheet against the United States, he conceded five goals against Denmark. He was part of the 1950 World Cup team as a reserve behind Sentimenti IV, but in the game against Paraguay Giuseppe Moro was called upon instead. After the 1950 World Cup he went to Napoli where he earned four caps for the national team, although he never secured a permanent starting position (the national team had called up 12 goalkeepers in a matter of 15 years). He ended his career after three seasons with Padova in 1956.

Style of play
Casari was known in particular for his imposing physique and agility as a goalkeeper, which allowed him to excel in this role. He was also known for his leadership and correct behaviour throughout his career, which earned him the nickname "il gigante buono" (the good giant).

References

External links
Trenta uomini in barca. I mondiali di calcio Brasile 1950 

1922 births
2013 deaths
Italian footballers
Association football goalkeepers
S.S.C. Napoli players
Calcio Padova players
Atalanta B.C. players
Serie A players
Serie B players
Olympic footballers of Italy
Footballers at the 1948 Summer Olympics
Italy international footballers
1950 FIFA World Cup players
Sportspeople from the Province of Bergamo
Italy B international footballers
Footballers from Lombardy